Henry Bingham Baring (4 March 1804 – 25 April 1869) was a British Conservative Party politician. He was the son of Henry Baring and Maria Matilda Bingham, daughter of American-born statesman William Bingham. Bingham was a half-brother of Evelyn Baring, 1st Earl of Cromer and a member of the distinguished Baring family.

He entered the House of Commons in 1831 as Member of Parliament for the rotten borough of Callington in Cornwall. When Callington was disenfranchised the following year, he was returned for the Marlborough constituency in Wiltshire, and held his seat until 1868.

See also 
Baron Ashburton

References 
 
 thePeerage.com

External links
 

1804 births
1869 deaths
Conservative Party (UK) MPs for English constituencies
Presidents of the Oxford Union
UK MPs 1831–1832
UK MPs 1832–1835
UK MPs 1835–1837
UK MPs 1837–1841
UK MPs 1841–1847
UK MPs 1847–1852
UK MPs 1852–1857
UK MPs 1857–1859
UK MPs 1859–1865
UK MPs 1865–1868
Members of the Parliament of the United Kingdom for constituencies in Cornwall
Henry
British people of American descent
British people of German descent